Nizhnekolymsk is a rural locality (a selo) in Pokhodsky Rural Okrug of Nizhnekolymsky District in the Sakha Republic, Russia, located within the Arctic Circle near the East Siberian Sea on the left bank of the Kolyma River near its confluence with the Anyuy,  from Chersky, the administrative center of the district, and  from Pokhodsk, the administrative center of the rural okrug. Its population as of the 2010 Census was 6, of whom 4 were male and 2 female, up from 0 recorded during the 2002 Census.

History
It was founded as a fort on the Kolyma River in 1644. On May 20, 1931, Nizhnekolymsk became the administrative center of Nizhnekolymsky District, but in 1942, due to constant flooding, the administrative center was transferred to Nizhniye Kresty. Nizhekolymsk had mostly been abandoned by 1968, although a small number of people continued to reside there.

Notable people
Alexander Penn (1906–1972), Israeli poet, born in Nizhnekolymsk

In fiction

Red Pawn, a 1932 screen play by Ayn Rand, takes place in the vicinity of Nizhnekolymsk, during the early years of the Soviet Union.

See also
Srednekolymsk
Verkhnekolymsk

References

Notes

Sources
Official website of the Sakha Republic. Registry of the Administrative-Territorial Divisions of the Sakha Republic. Nizhnekolymsky District.

External links
Анадырская и Чукотская епархия Русской Православной Церкви

Rural localities in Nizhnekolymsky District